Julio César Saguier (June 18, 1935 – January 13, 1987) was an Argentine lawyer and politician.

1935 births
Lawyers from Buenos Aires
Radical Civic Union politicians
1987 deaths
Burials at La Recoleta Cemetery
20th-century Argentine lawyers
Mayors of Buenos Aires